George Bisan is a Nigerian professional footballer forward.

Early life and career

Born in Kaduna, Nigeria, he moved with his family to Abuja at age four. Years later, he attended the Federal Science and Technical College Kafanchan and went on to play for Maracana FC. However, he was benched regularly because of his young age He was a Star player for De Marshal FC of Orozo Abuja Where he flourished In a midfield partnership with Muhammed Nurat. George Bisan is Known for His Strength, Pace, Shot Power and Powerful Tackles and some people liked him to Yaya Toure.

Professional career

Signed by Phnom Penh Crown in winter 2013, he formed a strike partnership with Shane Booysen that netted 47 goals in 2015. Next, he moved to Than Quang Ninh of Vietnam in 2016 and quickly settled into the country.

As injury ramifications forced him to miss out a few matches, he was not able to contribute much to the club and they cancelled his contract by May 2016.

Personal life

Bisan entered a Facebook photo competition during his time with Than Quang Ninh.

References

Nigerian footballers
Expatriate footballers in Vietnam
V.League 1 players
Nigerian expatriate footballers
Association football forwards
Expatriate footballers in Cambodia
Living people
1992 births
Phnom Penh Crown FC players
Nagaworld FC players
People from Kaduna State